Proteuxoa tibiata is a moth of the family Noctuidae. It is found in Australia, including Tasmania.

References 

Proteuxoa
Moths of Australia
Moths described in 1852